Phasia aurulans is a species of tachinid fly.

Description
Body length 7-9mm.

Distribution
It is a Holarctic species. In the Nearctic, it is distributed from coast to coast. In the Palaearctic it is distributed in Europe northward to Belgium, middle Sweden and St. Petersburg, northern Kazakhstan, southern Siberia, the Russian Far East and Japan.

Hosts
Hemiptera - Elasmucha lateralis

References

Bugguide.net. Species Phasia aurulans

Phasiinae
Diptera of Europe
Diptera of North America
Insects described in 1824